Bhore may refer to:
Bhore (Vidhan Sabha constituency), Indian assembly constituency in Bihar

People with the name
Joseph William Bhore (1878-1960), Indian civil servant
Alex Bhore, American musician, member of This Will Destroy You band

See also
Bhore Committee, 1943 committee in India on health issues, chaired by Joseph Bhore
Bhore Ghaut, mountain pass in Maharashtra, India